Palestinian Mexicans are Mexican citizens of Palestinian descent or Palestine-born people residing in Mexico. There are approximately 13,000 Mexicans of Palestinian origin.

History 
The period of Palestinian migration to Mexico took place from 1893 to 1949. Palestinian immigration to Mexico continued during the mid-20th century, when the Middle East witnessed a mass emigration of Lebanese, Syrians, and Palestinians fleeing from political instability. Approximately 23,000 Palestinians were registered as Arab without taking into account the different nationalities. With the decades that followed, tens of thousand of migrants from Palestine as well as other Arab nations began arriving in Mexico. World War I created a new wave as widespread food shortages and famine ravaged the Levant.

The delimitation is given by the data that the analyzed source throws. The flows of Palestinian immigrants to Mexico began at the end of the 20th century, and from then on they continued to occur, either increased or decreased according to the periods until reaching their end of emigration. The survey of the economic and sociocultural aspects of the Palestinians in Mexico and their process of integration into the country was based exclusively on the fieldwork carried out in Monterrey and Torreon.

Mexicans of Palestinian descent 
 Gabriel Zaid, writer, poet and intellectual
 Yasser Corona, former professional footballer

See also 

 Arab Mexicans
 Immigration to Mexico
 Mexico–Palestine relations

References 

 
Mexico
Immigration to Mexico
Ethnic groups in Mexico